Jeanne-Marie-Françoise Perregaux, later Ferrier-Perregaux (1777–1838) was a Swiss painter.

Ferrier-Perregaux was born in Lausanne, the daughter of architect and ivory carver Alexandre Perregaux. She was known for her portrait miniatures, and according to the letters of Sophie von La Roche also produced pastels.

References

1777 births
1838 deaths
Swiss women painters
18th-century Swiss painters
18th-century Swiss women artists
19th-century Swiss painters
19th-century Swiss women artists
People from Lausanne
Portrait miniaturists